Cole Hill is a mountain located in the Catskill Mountains of New York west of Margaretville. Pakatakan Mountain is located east-southeast of Cole Hill and Kettle Hill is located east-northeast.

References

Mountains of Delaware County, New York
Mountains of New York (state)